Joseph Christian Humper (born 2 June 1946, in Sherbro Island, Sierra Leone) is a bishop in the United Methodist Church. He serves as chair of the Truth and Reconciliation Commission in Sierra Leone. He began his service as Bishop in 1993, during the Sierra Leone Civil War, and retired in 2008. He was succeeded by John K. Yambasu.

Sources
 Biography of Humper at gbgm-umc.org

1946 births
Living people
Sierra Leonean United Methodist bishops
People from Bonthe District